The Noranda Caldera is a well-known large subaqueous Archean caldera complex within the Blake River Megacaldera Complex, Quebec, Canada. The caldera contains a 7-to-9-km-thick succession of bimodal mafic-felsic tholeiitic to calc-alkaline volcanic rocks which were erupted during five major series of volcanic activity.

The metallogenic impact of the Noranda Caldera is well-known, but the importance of the New Senator Caldera and Misema Caldera remains to be evaluated.

See also
Volcanism of Eastern Canada
List of volcanoes in Canada

References

Calderas of Quebec
Archean calderas
Polygenetic volcanoes
Landforms of Abitibi-Témiscamingue